Reid Miles (July 4, 1927 – February 2, 1993) was an American graphic designer and photographer best known for his work for Blue Note Records in the 1950s and 1960s.

Biography

Reid Miles was born in Chicago, Illinois, on July 4, 1927 but, following the Stock Market Crash and the separation of his parents, moved with his mother to Long Beach, California, in 1929.

After high school Miles joined the Navy and, following his discharge, moved to Los Angeles to enroll at Chouinard Art Institute.

After working in New York City in the early 1950s for John Hermansader and Esquire magazine and Margaret Hockaday's advertising firm, Miles was hired in his own right around 1955 by Francis Wolff of the jazz record label Blue Note to design album covers when the label began releasing their recordings on 12" LPs. Miles designed over five hundred covers, frequently incorporating the session photographs of Francis Wolff and, later, his own photographs, although many of his later designs dispensed entirely with photographs.

Miles wasn't particularly interested in jazz, professing to have much more of an interest in classical music; he received several copies of each Blue Note album he designed but gave most of them to friends or sold them to used record shops. Miles used the descriptions of the sessions relayed to him by producer Alfred Lion to create the artwork.

Lion's retirement as a record producer in 1967 coincided with the end of Miles' connection with Blue Note. "Fifty Bucks an album...they loved it, thought it was modern, they thought it went with the music...one or two colors to work with at that time and some outrageous graphics!"

As a photographer, Miles moved to Hollywood, California in 1971 and operated a studio under the name Reid Miles Inc. Many of his most famous shots were elaborate montages of people and group photographs, reminiscent of Norman Rockwell. Several of these were shot for record album covers, including Chicago IX: Chicago's Greatest Hits and The Basement Tapes. 

Miles created a fine art series of photographs. A signature technique of these were the visual elements of the photograph that continued across the matting and frames. 

He later directed television commercials, which garnered him a Clio Award in 1976.

Select discography

Blue Note Records
Bud! The Amazing Bud Powell (Vol. 3)
Cool Struttin'
Doin' the Thing
Hustlin'
Hub-Tones
Midnight Blue
A Night at Birdland Vol. 1
The Scene Changes: The Amazing Bud Powell (Vol. 5)
Serenade to a Soul Sister
Milt Jackson and the Thelonious Monk Quintet
The Sidewinder 
Out to Lunch!
Empyrean Isles
Our Man in Paris
No Room for Squares
Blue Train
Go (Dexter Gordon album)
A New Perspective
In 'n Out
Judgment!
It's Time! (album)
Into Somethin'
The Sermon (Jimmy Smith album)
Midnight Special (Jimmy Smith album)
Good Move!
Moanin' 
Speak No Evil
Out of This World (The Three Sounds album)
Midnight Creeper
Joyride (Stanley Turrentine album)
Trompeta Toccata
Una Mas
The Rumproller
Stick-Up!
Maiden Voyage (Herbie Hancock album)
Dippin'
Soul Station
Quartet/Quintet/Sextet
Gettin' Around
Speakin' My Piece
Hank Mobley (album)
Night Dreamer
Gravy Train (Lou Donaldson album)
Takin' Off
Speak Like a Child (album)
Dialogue (Bobby Hutcherson album)
Jutta Hipp with Zoot Sims
Happy Frame of Mind
Sonny Rollins, Volume 1
Lee-Way
Mode for Joe
A Swingin' Affair 
Open Sesame (Freddie Hubbard album)
Introducing Kenny Burrell
Let Freedom Ring
Blues Walk
Free Form (Donald Byrd album)

Others 
Chicago IX: Chicago's Greatest Hits
The Basement Tapes
Goin' Places
The Gambler

Sources 

1927 births
1993 deaths
Artists from Chicago
People from Long Beach, California
Chouinard Art Institute alumni
Album-cover and concert-poster artists
American graphic designers
20th-century American photographers
Artists from California